The Bangladesh Women's Football League simply known as WFL and officially as Bashundhara Group Women's Football League for sponsorship reasons, is the highest level of women's club football competition of Bangladesh established in 2011.The league hosted and run by Bangladesh Football Federation.

History

Bangladesh Women's Football League is the country's top flight domestic women's football league which is founded in 2011 by Bangladesh Football Federation. After two consecutive season, the league was postponed for indefinite time because of unknown reason. After a long gap of 7 years, Bangladesh Football Federation organised the third edition in 2020. Currently Cholo Kheli Trust is the Strategic partner for Bangladesh Women's Football and for next three years. Cholo Kheli Trust, a charitable foundation formed to work in the fields of Sports, Education, Health combined with Information, create strategies and execute them in association with respective Ministries. Inspire next generation youth of Bangladesh to love, appreciate and pick sports and Play. The Trust also want them to be well Educated, Healthy and be informed by the Best standards in the World.

Champions

Successful clubs by seasons

Performance by clubs

Clubs

Current clubs (2021–22)
Twelve clubs will compete in the 2021–22 Bangladesh Women's Football League:

Former clubs

All-time BWFL table

League or status at 2021–22 season:

Head coaches

Stats and players

Seasonal statistics

Top goal scorers

Top scorers by season

Best Player of the Season

Sponsorship

Media coverage 
T Sports broadcast the 2020–21 season of the league. The 2021–22 season was broadcast by the official YouTube channel of BFF.

Stadiums

See also
 AFC Women's Club Championship

References

 
Football leagues in Bangladesh
Bangladesh
Sports leagues established in 2011
2011 establishments in Bangladesh
Professional sports leagues in Bangladesh
Women's football in Bangladesh